The number of women sitting in the House of Commons increased to a new maximum during the 22nd Canadian Parliament; the number of women senators also increased. 47 women ran for seats in the Canadian House of Commons in the 1953 federal election; four were elected.

Two more women were named to the Canadian senate: Nancy Hodges in November 1953 and Florence Elsie Inman in July 1955, bringing the total number of women senators to six. Senator Iva Campbell Fallis died in March 1956.

Party Standings

Members of the House of Commons

Senators

References 

Lists of women politicians in Canada